County Route 527 (CR 527) is a county highway in the U.S. state of New Jersey. The highway extends  from Main Street (Route 166 and CR 549) in Toms River Township to Pompton Avenue (Route 23) in Cedar Grove. It passes through more counties (six) than any other county route in New Jersey. CR 527 is also the second longest 500-series county route in New Jersey after Route 519. The county route traverses through the northernmost stretches of the Pine Barrens, much of the Raritan Valley and Rahway Valley regions (the route provides access to Monmouth Battlefield State Park, Rutgers University–New Brunswick, Delaware and Raritan Canal State Park, Watchung Reservation, and South Mountain Reservation), and the First and Second Watchung Mountains. It passes through Ocean, Monmouth, Middlesex, Somerset, Union, and Essex counties on the eastern side of the state.

It has a 2.48 mile concurrency with Route 18 in Middlesex County in addition to other minor state highways and county roads. The route interchanges with the Garden State Parkway and Interstates 195, 95 (New Jersey Turnpike), 287, 78, and 280. It was first given the number 527 in 1954.

Route description

CR 527 begins at a traffic light with New Jersey Route 166 in Toms River. Passing some local roads at the beginning, CR 527 crosses an interchange with the Garden State Parkway at .53 of a mile. More than a mile later, New Jersey Route 37 crosses 527 at a traffic light. Continuing through Toms River Township, CR 571 merges into 527 for about 3/4 of a mile. At , State Route 70 crosses CR 527. Just past ten miles (16 km), CR 547 crosses in Jackson Township. Further in Jackson Township, CR 527 joins CR 528 for a  concurrency. At the end of the concurrency, CR 527 continues straight while CR 528 leaves to the left and CR 626 (Bennetts Mills Road) leaves to the right.

At , CR 526 and CR 527 intersect. Less than a mile later, Interstate 195 interchanges with CR 527. Past this interchange, the route passes east of the Jackson Township Park & Ride, a park and ride facility serving Academy Bus Lines. At , CR 527 leaves Ocean County and enters Monmouth County. In Smithburg (the Freehold / Millstone / Manalapan township border), County Routes 524 and 537 cross. Past  at Carrs Corner, CR 527 turns to the right heading northeast while an alternate route to 527, CR 527A begins straight ahead. At , New Jersey Route 33 crosses at a traffic light in Manalapan. CR 527 heads north enters Englishtown. In Englishtown, CR 527 reaches the northern terminus of CR 527A at South Main Street and later forms a  concurrency with CR 522. At , CR 527 re-enters Manalapan for a short distance. At , CR 527 enters Monroe Township which is in Middlesex County. 527 spends a short time in Monroe as it soon enters the township of Old Bridge. At , CR 520 crosses at a traffic light.

After passing local roads in Old Bridge, CR 527 forms a brief concurrency with CR 516 as they cross over Route 18. CR 527 leaves to the left at Old Matawan Road, crosses the South River, and enters the Old Bridge section of East Brunswick. After the intersection with CR 615, it continues on Old Bridge Turnpike into East Brunswick and South River. Just before , CR 535 crosses 527 at a traffic light. Entering East Brunswick again, Route 18 and CR 527 merge for 2.48 miles (6 km). In this section, there are exits for Interstate 95 (the New Jersey Turnpike) and U.S. Route 1. CR 527 follows Route 18 into New Brunswick and exits the concurrency with Route 18 and forms one for the entire length of Route 172 through Rutgers University's Douglass Campus. Heading northwest along New Brunswick's George Street, CR 527 then merges into a concurrency with Route 27 on Albany Street. CR 527 turns off Route 27 at Easton Avenue. At Hamilton Street (unsigned CR 514), CR 527 continues past numerous businesses towards the outskirts of New Brunswick.

At , CR 527 enters Franklin Township, Somerset County and approximately a half-mile later, CR 527 splits into a four-lane highway, known locally as Easton Avenue. At , the roads split again and soon reach Interstate 287. At , CR 527 crosses the town border and enters South Bound Brook. At , Route 28 crosses. After the intersection with Route 28, CR 527 enters Bridgewater and crosses with U.S. Route 22. In Watchung, CR 529 leaves to the right. Just past the  mark, the road divides again for a short time. In between this divided stage, CR 531 merges in. 531 leaves as the highways merge again.

Now in Union County, CR 527 has two partial interchanges with Interstate 78 as it skirts the Watchung Reservation. In the city of Summit, CR 527 and the easternmost section of CR 512 split into one-way pairs through an interchange with Route 24 and a concurrency with Route 124. CR 527 enters Essex County after the concurrency ends. CR 527 enters Millburn and splits into one-way pairs again, concurrent with CR 577 as it enters downtown. At , CR 577 leaves to the right. Just before , CR 510 crosses. The road passes by St. Barnabas Medical Center. At , CR 508 crosses at a traffic light as the route enters Livingston. In Caldwell, CR 527 merges with CR 506 for about .62 of a mile. CR 527 ends at an intersection with Route 23 in Cedar Grove.

History

From the New-East Brunswick Line to Old Bridge, the road was once maintained by the East Brunswick and New Brunswick Turnpike Company, chartered in 1865. It was once part of State Route S-24, now Route 18, though this was bypassed. 

The New Brunswick section of CR 527 was known as County Route 3R11 back in 1947. The parts south of that in Middlesex County was known as County Route 3R10. By 1954, the road was known as County Route 527, part of the 500-series county roads adopted by the state of New Jersey.

Two former spur routes of CR 527 existed. The first CR 527 Spur in Somerset County ran along what is now Somerset CR 651, CR 512, and Somerset CR 613. The second CR 527 Spur ran along what is now Essex County Routes 608 and 649.

Major intersections

CR 527A

County Route 527A (also known as County Route 527 Alternate or CR 527A) is a county highway in Monmouth County, New Jersey. It crosses Route 33 about halfway between its two termini. 

The section of the highway named Iron Ore Road was once part of the Manalapanville and Englishtown Turnpike, chartered in 1863 to run from Englishtown to Manalapanville, on the border of Millstone, including High Bridge Road and Main Street into Englishtown and Dugan's Grove Road.

Near its northern terminus, CR 527A formerly followed Iron Ore Road to its end at Millhurst Road (CR 527) in Manalapan, but in late 2015, a jurisdiction swap between Monmouth County and Manalapan / Englishtown routed the county road on a straighter course into the borough.

Major intersections

See also

References

External links

NJ State Highways: CR 515-530
CR 527 pictures

527
527
527
527
527
527
527